The Lute Player or Singing Man with Lute is a 1622 painting by Dirck van Baburen. Since 1955 it has been in the  Centraal Museum in Utrecht.

Having encountered Caravaggio's style in Rome, van Baburen popularised it back in the Dutch Republic, particularly images of single musicians such as this one, drawing on the Italian artist's The Lute Player and setting a trend which also resulted in Frans Hals's The Lute Player of 1623.

References

Bibliography
  Anna Tummers (ed.), Frans Hals, Oog in oog met Rembrandt, Rubens en Titiaan Frans Hals Museum, Haarlem, 2013 p. 112

1622 paintings
Paintings by Dirck van Baburen
Paintings in the collection of the Centraal Museum
Musical instruments in art